Lokalposten was a local newspaper published in Rakkestad, Norway.

History and profile
The newspaper was first published on 4 January 1930, and had no formal political affiliation. In 1941, during the occupation of Norway by Nazi Germany, the Germans amalgamated it with the newspaper Rakkestad Avis, which was then published under the name Østfold Bygdeblad.

References

1930 disestablishments in Norway
1941 disestablishments in Norway
Newspapers established in 1930
Publications disestablished in 1941
Norwegian-language newspapers
Defunct newspapers published in Norway
Mass media in Østfold